The Pudman Creek, a perennial stream that is part of the Lachlan sub-catchment of the Murrumbidgee catchment within the Murray–Darling basin, is located in the South West Slopes region of New South Wales, Australia.

Course and features 

The creek descends  over its  course.

See also 

 List of rivers of New South Wales (L-Z)
 Rivers of New South Wales

References

External links
 

Rivers of New South Wales
Tributaries of the Lachlan River
Hilltops Council